Steven William Prestwich (5 March 195416 January 2011) was an English-born Australian drummer, guitarist, singer and songwriter. After relocating from Liverpool, Prestwich was the founding and long-term drummer for the band Cold Chisel, which formed in Adelaide in 1973. He wrote the Cold Chisel songs "When the War Is Over" and "Forever Now". Prestwich also had a short spell with the Little River Band in the 1980s. He released two solo albums in the 2000s.

Prestwich died on 16 January 2011 following surgery to remove a brain tumour, two months before his 57th birthday.

Biography
Prestwich was born in Liverpool, England in 1954. He was a member of a folk-rock band called Sandy in 1970. His family relocated to Adelaide, South Australia in 1971 when he was 17. He was a member of Elizabeth band Ice from 1971 to 1973.

In 1973, he was the founding drummer for heavy metal group, Orange, with the line-up of Jimmy Barnes, Ian Moss, Don Walker and Leszek Kaczmarek. Orange evolved into Cold Chisel in 1974 and a year later, Kaczmarek was replaced by Phil Small. Prestwich remained a member until early 1983 and during his time in Cold Chisel, he wrote "When the War Is Over" and "Forever Now". Both songs appeared on the 1982 album Circus Animals. He co-wrote with Walker the song Flame Trees from the 1984 album Twentieth Century. He briefly rejoined Cold Chisel for their Last Stand Tour from October to December 1983.

From 1984 to 1986 Prestwich was the drummer in the Little River Band. He toured the United States and released two albums with LRB. Little River Band recorded a version of "When the War is Over" with John Farnham on vocals. Prestwich rejoined Cold Chisel in later reformations.

Prestwich released his first solo album, Since You've Been Gone in August 2000, which he also produced. His second album, Every Highway was released in October 2009.

Prestwich was the father of a daughter, Melody, and a son, Vaughan.

Prestwich died at the Macquarie University Hospital in Sydney after not regaining consciousness following brain surgery to remove a tumour diagnosed less than two weeks before.

Cold Chisel singer Jimmy Barnes later planted a flame tree in Prestwich's memory at the National Arboretum Canberra.

Discography

Albums

References

General
  Note: Archived [on-line] copy has limited functionality.
Specific

External links

 Online memorial
  

1954 births
2011 deaths
Australian drummers
British male drummers
Australian male singers
Cold Chisel members
Deaths from brain tumor
English male singers
English emigrants to Australia
Little River Band members
Musicians from Liverpool
Deaths from cancer in New South Wales
Australian rock drummers
English rock drummers
Australian songwriters